, born , is a former member of the Imperial House of Japan. She is the fifth and youngest daughter of Emperor Shōwa and Empress Kōjun, and the youngest sister of the Emperor Emeritus of Japan, Akihito. She married Hisanaga Shimazu on 3 March 1960. As a result, she gave up her imperial title and left the Japanese Imperial Family, as required by law.

Biography

Princess Takako was born at the Tokyo Imperial Palace.

As with her elder sisters, she was not raised by her biological parents, but by a succession of court ladies at a separate palace built for her and her sisters in the Marunouchi district of Tokyo. She graduated from the Gakushuin Peers School, and was also tutored along with her siblings in the English language by an American tutor, Elizabeth Grey Vining during the American occupation of Japan following World War II. Princess Takako graduated from Gakushuin University Women's College with a degree in English literature in March 1957.

On 10 March 1960, Princess Takako wed Hisanaga Shimazu (born 29 March 1934, Tokyo), the son of the late Count Hisanori Shimazu and (at the time) an analyst at the Japan Export-Import Bank (JEXIM). They married in a Tokyo restaurant in a ceremony attended by Hirohito, Empress Nagako, and Akihito. The couple were introduced by common acquaintances at the Gakushuin.  They shared a common interest in the music of Perez Prado.

Upon her marriage, the Princess relinquished her membership in the Imperial Family and adopted her husband's surname, in accordance with the 1947 Imperial Household Law. Described by Western media sources at the time as a "commoner bank clerk," the groom was actually a grandson of the last daimyō of Satsuma Domain, Shimazu Tadayoshi, and thus a maternal first cousin to Empress Kōjun, making the bride and groom first cousins once removed. Takako and her husband had one son, Yoshihisa Shimazu, who was born on 5 April 1962.

In 1963, three years after her marriage, she narrowly escaped from an attempted kidnapping. Due to extensive media coverage, the location of the couple's home was common knowledge, as was her $500,000 marriage dowry (in Japan, the bride is given a sum of money for her marriage). A member of the criminal group tipped off the police before the kidnapping could occur.

Hisanaga Shimazu pursued a thirty-year career with JEXIM, including postings to Washington D.C. in the United States and Sydney, Australia accompanied by his wife. He became a member of the Board of Directors of the Sony Corporation upon his retirement from the bank in 1987, served as executive director of the Sony Foundation for Science Education from 1994 to 2001, and is currently research director of the Yamashina Institute for Ornithology.

The former Princess has made numerous appearances on Japanese television as a commentator on world events, and is also on the Board of Directors of the Prince Hotels chain.

Honours

National honours
 Grand Cordon of the Order of the Precious Crown

Ancestry

Gallery

Notes

References
Foreign Affairs Association of Japan, The Japan Year Book (Tokyo: Kenkyusha Press, 1939–40, 1941–42, 1944–45, 1945–46, 1947–48).
Takie Sugiyama Lebra, Above the Clouds: Status Culture of the Modern Japanese Nobility (Berkeley: University of California Press, 1992).
Ben-ami Shillony, Enigma of the Emperors: Sacred Subservience in Japanese History (Kent, U.K.: Global Oriental, 2006).

1939 births
Living people
Japanese princesses
Japanese Shintoists
Shimazu clan
People from Tokyo
Gakushuin University alumni

Grand Cordons (Imperial Family) of the Order of the Precious Crown